A  was a system of punishment used in Japanese regional schools in the post-Meiji period to promote standard speech.

During the Edo period under the Tokugawa shogunate most Japanese people could not travel outside of their home domain. As a result, regional Japanese dialects were relatively isolated and became increasingly distinct. After the Meiji Restoration the government, in emulation of the European nation states, sought to create a standard Japanese speech. A Tokyo dialect, specifically that of the upper-class Yamanote area, became the model for Standard Japanese, widely used in schools, publishing, and radio broadcasting. By the early twentieth century, the Ministry of Education and other authorities instituted various policies to reduce or suppress regional differences.

The use of Hogen fuda was most prominent in the Tōhoku, Kyushu and Ryukyu Islands (including Okinawa) as they are geographically and linguistically most distant from the Tokyo dialect. The issue is most prominent in regard to Ryukyuan languages as there are groups, such as the Kariyushi Club, which advocate the languages to be officially recognised by the Japanese government as a language (and Ryukyu as a nation).

In Okinawa, the card was initially voluntarily adopted by Okinawan students at the start of the 20th century, but became mandatory as assimilation policies increased following 1917. A student who spoke Okinawan would be forced to wear the card, until another student also spoke in Okinawan, and then it would pass to the new transgressor, with the student wearing it at the end of the school day punished by the teachers.

See also
 Codification
 Language planning
 Prestige (sociolinguistics)
 Usage
 Symbole, a similar punishment for Breton-speaking students
 Welsh Not, a similar punishment for Welsh-speaking students

References

Linguistic rights
Linguistic discrimination
Ryukyuan languages
Okinawa Prefecture
School punishments
Education in Japan
Punishments
Language policy in Japan